Many of the technologies used in human medicine are also used in the veterinary field, although often in slightly different ways. Veterinarians use a variety of technologies for diagnostic and therapeutic purposes to better understand and improve the health of their animal patients. Recent trends in veterinary technology have moved towards the integration of hand-held devices and consumer based technology to monitor pets and interact with veterinarians.

General tools

Common diagnostic technologies

Emerging technologies

See also 
 Health technology
 Veterinary medicine
 Veterinary physician
 Veterinary technician
 Animal technology

References 

Veterinary equipment